An environmental disaster or ecological disaster is defined as a catastrophic event regarding the natural environment that is due to human activity. This point distinguishes environmental disasters from other disturbances such as natural disasters and intentional acts of war such as nuclear bombings.

Environmental disasters show how the impact of humans' alteration of the land has led to widespread and/or long-lasting consequences. These disasters have included deaths of wildlife, humans and plants, or severe disruption of human life or health, possibly requiring migration.

Environmental disasters
Environmental disasters historically have affected agriculture, biodiversity including wildlife, the economy and human health. The most common causes include pollution that seeps into groundwater or a body of water, emissions into the atmosphere and depletion of natural resources, industrial activity or agricultural practices.

The following is a list of major environmental disasters: 
 Seveso disaster, 1976 – Release of dioxin. 
 Love Canal, 1978 - Neighborhood in Niagara Falls, New York that was contaminated by 21,000 tons of toxic chemicals, including at least twelve that are known carcinogens (halogenated organics, chlorobenzenes, and dioxin among them), from a former chemical waste dump site. President Carter declared a state of emergency in 1978, and it eventually led to the destruction of homes and relocation of more than 800 families. The effects of the disaster led to the 1980 Comprehensive Environmental Response, Compensation, and Liability Act, better known as Superfund. The Love Canal Disaster is also credited as the start of the environmental activism movement in the United States.
 Ok Tedi environmental disaster, 1984. , mine operators have discharged about two billion tons of tailings, overburden and mine-induced erosion into the Ok Tedi river system. About  of forest has died or is under stress.
 Bhopal disaster, 1984 – Release of methyl isocyanate gas and other chemicals. Some estimate 8,000 people died within two weeks. A government affidavit in 2006 stated the leak caused 558,125 injuries including 38,478 temporary partial and approximately 3,900 severely and permanently disabling injuries.
 Chernobyl disaster, 1986 – The official Soviet count of 31 deaths has been disputed. An UNSCEAR report places the total confirmed deaths from radiation at 64 as of 2008. The eventual death toll could reach 4,000. Some 50 emergency workers died of acute radiation syndrome, nine children died of thyroid cancer and an estimated total of 3940 died from radiation-induced cancer and leukemia.
 Hanford Nuclear, 1986 – The U.S. government declassifies 19,000 pages of documents indicating that between 1946 and 1986, the Hanford Site near Richland, Washington, released thousands of US gallons of radioactive liquids. Radioactive waste was both released into the air and flowed into the Columbia River (which flows to the ocean).
 Exxon Valdez oil spill, 1989 –  spilled  of crude oil.
 Kingston Fossil Plant coal fly ash slurry spill, 2008 – spilled  of slurry from a coal plant, covering 300 acres, flowing down several rivers, destroying homes and contaminating water. Volume spilled was over 7 times as much as the volume of oil spilled in the Deepwater Horizon disaster.
 Deepwater Horizon oil spill, 2010 – An explosion killed 11 men working on the platform and injured 34 others.
 Fukushima Daiichi nuclear disaster, 2011 – was an energy accident, initiated primarily by the tsunami following the Tōhoku earthquake on 11 March 2011. Immediately after the earthquake, the active reactors automatically shut down their sustained fission reactions. The insufficient cooling led to three nuclear meltdowns, hydrogen-air explosions, and the release of radioactive material. Level 7 event classification of the International Nuclear Event Scale.
 Ohio train derailment, 2023 – A Norfolk Southern freight train carrying hazardous materials derailed in East Palestine, Ohio. The rail cars burned for several days, releasing chemicals into the air. Norfolk has been accused of mismanagement.

Climate change and disaster risks 

A 2013 report examined the relationship between disasters and poverty world-wide. It concludes that, without concerted action, there could be upwards of 325 million people living in the 49 countries most exposed to the full range of natural hazards and climate extremes in 2040.

Social Vulnerability and Environmental Disaster 
According to author Daniel Murphy, different groups of people are able to adapt to environmental disasters differently due to social factors such as age, race, class, gender, and nationality. Murphy argues that while developed countries with access to resources that can help mitigate environmental disasters are often the countries that contribute the most to factors that can increase the risk of said disasters, developing countries experience the impacts of environmental disasters more intensely than their wealthier counterparts.  It is often the case that the populations that do not contribute to climate change are not only in geographic location that experience more environmental disasters, but also have fewer resources to mitigate the impact of the disasters.  For example, when Hurricane Katrina hit Louisiana in 2005, many scientists argued that climate change had increased the severity of the hurricane.  Although the majority of the U.S. emissions that can contribute to climate change come from industry and transport, the people who were hardest-hit by Katrina were not the heads of large companies within the country. Rather, the poor black communities within Louisiana were the most devastated by the hurricane, despite not contributing as heavily to factors like climate change that likely increased the severity of Hurricane Katrina. 

Mitigation efforts 
There have been many attempts throughout recent years to mitigate the impact of environmental disasters.  Environmental disaster is caused by human activity, so many believe that such disasters can be prevented or have their consequences curbed by human activity as well.  Efforts to attempt mitigation are evident in cities such as Miami, Florida, in which houses along the coast are built a few feet off of the ground in order to decrease the damage caused by rising tides due to rising sea-levels.  Although mitigation efforts such as those found in Miami might be effective in the short-term, many environmental groups are concerned with whether or not mitigation provides long-term solutions to the consequences of environmental disaster.

See also

 Anthropogenic hazard
 List of environmental issues
 Environmental hazard
 Emergency management
 Environmental emergency
 Ecocide
 Malthusian catastrophe

References

Further reading
 

!